Kalisochina Adrushtam is a 1968 Indian Telugu-language drama film, produced by M. Jagannatha Rao under the S.V.S. Films banner and directed by K. Viswanath. It stars N. T. Rama Rao and Kanchana, with music composed by T. V. Raju.

Plot
The film begins with Rao Bahadur Raghavendra Rao traveling in a train along with his pregnant wife. In between, due to the labor pains, she has been admitted in a hospital where she dies along with the baby. At the same time, a poor woman Parvatamma (Santha Kumari), tries to commit suicide, after giving birth to a baby boy due to poverty. Rao Bahadur notices it and decides to adopt the child. Parvatamma happily agrees and gives the child to Rao Bahadur. Years roll by, the child grows up by the name Prakash (N. T. Rama Rao) and falls for a beautiful girl Sobha (Kanchana), daughter of Paanakaalu (Dhulpala), head of a village. Though Panakalu is a cruel moneylender, his children Sobha & Ganapathi (Rajababu) are good-natured. Once Prakash visits their village, unfortunately, Parvatamma also stays there along with her elder son Ranga (Satyanarayana) and younger daughter Gauri (Sandhya Rani). Ranga is a drunkard that's why his father-in-law (Mikkilineni) does not send Ranga's wife Lakshmi (Sukanya) to his house. Meanwhile, Ganapathi loves with Gauri. Parvatamma recognizes Prakash as her son by the chain on his neck which was presented by her during his birth time. Parallelly, Rao Bahadur becomes sick and Prakash hurriedly rushes back. Parvatamma also follows him to see Rao Bahadur and he passes away. After his death, Prakash suspects that something is fishy, ao, he digs the matter through servant Ramayya when his heart is felt with joy knowing the truth. Immediately, Prakash moves to the village and brings his family. Here Ranga who is already a slave to vices goes into the trap of crooked manager Bhujanga Rao (Prabhakar Reddy). Bhujangam's eye fall on Gauri and Ranga promises him that he will perform  Gauri's marriage with him. Prakash tries to change his brother's attitude & behavior in many ways but he does not listen to him and also makes a lot of mess. At that point in time, Prakash gives up his entire property to his brother, unites him with his wife Lakshmi and leaves the house along with his mother & sister back to the village. Knowing this, Paanakaalu refuses Sobha to marry Prakash. On the other side, Ganapathi who is fed up with his father's attitude also leaves the house. Eventually, Ranga cheats and takes divorce from his Lakshmi and throws her out. Simultaneously, he traps Paanakaalu and makes him agree for his remarriage with Sobha. Now Prakash enters in the disguised form of Sardarji, teaches a lesson to his brother & Paanakaalu with help of Sobha & Ganapathi and reunites the family. Finally, the movie ends on a happy note with the marriages of Prakash & Sobha and Ganapathi & Gauri.

Cast
N. T. Rama Rao as Prakash
Kanchana as Sobha
Satyanarayana as Ranga
Prabhakar Reddy as Bhujangam
Raja Babu as Ganapathi
Allu Ramalingaiah
Mikkilineni 
Dhulipala as Paanakalu
Santha Kumari as Parvatamma
Geetanjali 
Vijaya Lalitha as item number
Sandhya Rani as Gauri
Sukanya as Lakshmi

Soundtrack

Music composed by T. V. Raju.

References

External links

1968 films
1960s Telugu-language films
Indian drama films
1968 drama films
Indian black-and-white films
Films directed by K. Viswanath
Films scored by T. V. Raju